, also known as , is a Japanese actress and voice actor. From Osaka Prefecture, her real name is Takayo Sunagawa, and her maiden name Sumikawa. Her husband is Shingo Sunagawa of the original JAC Brothers.

Filmography

TV drama

Voice actor

References 
 ^ http://www.behindthevoiceactors.com/Makoto-Sumikawa/

External links

Japanese voice actresses
Japanese television actresses
People from Fujiidera, Osaka
1964 births
Living people
20th-century Japanese actresses